The Upper St Clair School District is a public school district serving the Pittsburgh suburb of Upper St. Clair, Pennsylvania. The District encompasses approximately 10 square miles. Upper Saint Clair School District features three elementary schools for grades K–4: Albert F. Baker Elementary, Dwight D. Eisenhower Elementary, and Carl R. Streams Elementary.  The school district also includes two middle schools, Fort Couch Middle School and Boyce Middle School. Boyce Middle School contains both 5th- and 6th-level students. Fort Couch Middle School contains grades 7th and 8th grades, and is the oldest running school of the school district. According to 2000 census data, it serves a resident population of 20,053.

References

Education in Pittsburgh area
School districts in Allegheny County, Pennsylvania